Transmembrane channel like 3 is a protein that in humans is encoded by the TMC3 gene.

References

Further reading